Zhongshan is a prefecture-level city in the south of the Pearl River Delta in Guangdong province, China. As of the 2020 census, the whole city with 4,418,060 inhabitants is now part of the Guangzhou–Shenzhen conurbation with 65,565,622 inhabitants. The city-core subdistricts used to be called Shiqi or Shekki.

Zhongshan is one of the few Chinese cities to be named after a person. It was originally named Xiangshan ("Fragrant Mountain"; Cantonese: Heung-saan), but was renamed in 1925 in honor of Sun Yat-sen, who is known in China as "Sun Zhongshan". Sun was the founding father of the Republic of China who is also regarded positively by the People's Republic. He was born in Cuiheng village in Nanlang Township of what was then Xiangshan County.

Names
Until 1925, Zhongshan was generally known as Xiangshan or Heung-san (Siangshan), in reference to the many flowers that grew in the mountains nearby. The city was renamed in honor of Sun Yat-sen, who had adopted the name Zhongshan. Sun is considered by both the People's Republic of China and the Republic of China to be the "Father of Modern China", and was from Cuiheng village – now part of Nanlang Town in Zhongshan.

History

Thousands of years ago, much of the Zhongshan area lay within the Pearl River estuary, with only scattered islands above the surface. Gradually from south to north, the area filled in with alluvial silt and became dry land. The northern parts of today's Zhongshan did not fill in until the time of the Ming Dynasty.

The Zhongshan area was part of an extended Dongguan County during the Tang Dynasty (618–907 AD), and was a significant sea salt producer. In 1082, during the Northern Song Dynasty, a fortified settlement called Xiangshan was founded in the area, marking the first official use of the name by which it would be known throughout most of its modern history. The prosperous settlement was then upgraded to a county in 1152. After the collapse of the Southern Song Dynasty, many descendants of Song court officials, including members of the imperial family, settled in Xiangshan. Significant land formation in the area of Zhongshan occurred since Ming Dynasty. Under the Qing Dynasty, embankments were built to prevent flooding in the new alluvial lands, and the area of cultivation was extended.

Much of the First Opium War took place in and around Xiangshan. In 1839, the official Lin Zexu arrived in Xiangshan and ordered the expulsion of Sir Charles Elliot and other British traders from the area. Qing Dynasty soldiers resisted British attacks on the area in 1840, but were ultimately overwhelmed.

After the Opium Wars opened the region to foreign influence, a number of Xiangshan residents, including Sun Zhongshan (Yatsen), left to study overseas and were among the creators of modern China. Xiangshan was one of the first counties in China liberated as part of the Xinhai Revolution. After Sun Zhongshan's death in 1925, the commander-in-chief of the armed forces of the Republic of China decided to memorialize Sun by renaming his county of birth from Xiangshan to Zhongshan.

Nationalist and Communist units launched guerrilla attacks on Japanese occupancy forces and their Collaborators beginning in 1942. On August 15, 1945, Japanese forces declared an unconditional surrender, and Zhongshan was liberated.

Zhongshan was the scene of fighting during the Chinese Civil War and was held for much of the war by Nationalists. On October 30, 1949, however, the People's Liberation Army defeated Nationalist forces in Zhongshan, and the county came under the control of the People's Republic of China.

In 1983, Zhongshan was elevated in administrative status from a county to a county-level city under the administration of Foshan. In 1988 Zhongshan became a prefecture-level city.

Geography and Climate
Zhongshan is located along the west side of the mouth of the Pearl River, directly opposite Shenzhen and Hong Kong. It lies south of Guangzhou and Foshan and north of Zhuhai and Macau. The northern part of Zhongshan, including most of the urbanized area, lies on the alluvial plains of the Pearl River Delta, while the southern part of the city's territory reaches into a range of coastal hills.

The most notable of these are the Wugui Hills. The city's current geography is typical of southern China: numerous steep mountains and hills with alluvial plains in between down to the coastline.

Southern China experiences fairly frequent typhoons and thunderstorms, and most rain falls between April and September.

Cityscape

Zhongshan is a city of numerous leafy parks, wide boulevards, and monuments. Notable sights include:

 Sunwen Road West (or Sunwen Xilu) in Zhongshan Old Town, a pedestrian mall lined with dozens of restored buildings from the colonial period in treaty port style. Several of these buildings were built in the 1920s.
 The seven-story Fufeng Pagoda, built in 1608 and visible from all over the city, is on a hill in Zhongshan Park, which abuts the western end of Sunwen Road West immediately to its north. A Sun Yat-sen memorial pavilion stands near the pagoda.
 Sunwen Memorial Park, at the southern end of Xingzhong Road, is the site of the largest bronze sculpture of Sun Yat-sen in the world.
Zhongshan, like many cities in China, has a rapidly changing cityscape with many new buildings under construction. Currently, the tallest completed buildings in the city are the two Zhongshan International Finance Center Towers. These will be eclipsed by the Perfect Eagle Golden Square tower, which will reach , with an expected completion date in 2018.

Administration
Zhongshan is a prefecture-level city of the Guangdong province. An uncommon administrative feature is that it has no county-level division, but the municipal government does group the 24 township-level divisions into five district areas. The city government directly administers six Subdistricts and 18 towns:

 Cuiheng New Area

Language
Although the main ethnic group in Zhongshan is Han Chinese, there is no one dominant language or dialect spoken making Zhongshan one of the most diverse cities in China. Dialects spoken in the city ranging from the more common Yue, Hakka, and Min dialects to the more local Shiqi, Shatian, Longdu, Nanlang, Sanxiang, Guzhen, Sanjiao, and Zhangjiabian dialects as well as Wuiguishan, the only Hakka dialect in the city. The most common language, however, is Cantonese.

Yue
 Shiqi dialect – Shiqiqu Subdistrict, Dongqu Subdistrict, Nanqu Subdistrict
 Shatian dialect – Xiqu Subdistrict, Tanzhou Town, Shenwan Town, Banfu Town, Henglan Town, Xiaolan Town, Dongfeng Town, Nantou Town, Huangpu Town, Minzhong Town, Gangkou Town, Fusha Town, Dongsheng Town
 Guzhen dialect – Guzhen Town
 Sanjiao dialect – Sanjiao Town

Min
 Nanlang dialect – Nanlang Town
 Sanxiang dialect – Sanxiang Town
 Longdu dialect – Dachong Town, Shaxi Town
 Zhangjiabian dialect – THIDZ Subdistrict

Hakka
 Wuguishan dialect – Wuguishan Subdistrict

Economy

Primary industries
Primary productions are agricultural, such as rice, lychee, banana, and sugar cane. Added to this, horticulture in Xiaolan Town is famous throughout southern China for its blooming chrysanthemum and chickens.

Manufacturing industries
Zhongshan, Dongguan, Nanhai, and Shunde are dubbed the 'Four Little Tigers' in Guangdong. The proximity of Zhongshan to Hong Kong and Macau is an advantage to its economic development, especially in manufacturing.

In the 1980s, Zhongshan had a relatively developed state-owned enterprise (SOE) sector that was used to stimulate Township and Village Enterprises (TVE) development in the countryside. Currently, the SOE sector is much weaker, and the economy is dominated by foreign investment and TVEs, and by specialized 'manufacturing towns'. Each of these towns specializes in making a particular product. Most of the towns have earned a reputation as leading manufacturers in their pillar industries.

These specialized manufacturing towns include:
 Dachong Town for mahogany furniture
 Dongfeng Town for electric household appliances
 Guzhen Town for lighting fixtures
 Huangpu Town for food processing
 Shaxi Town for casual wear manufacturing
 Xiaolan Town for locks and hardware, as well as for electronic acoustics products

The government of Zhongshan encourages "Research and Design" in the region by setting up national level research centres and specialized industrial regions. For example, the Zhongshan National Torch High-Tech Industrial Development Zone was established in 1990 in the east of the city by the Ministry of Science and Technology and the governments of Guangdong province and Zhongshan. Zhongshan Port, which ranks among the top 10 ports nationwide in container-handling capacity, is in the zone. Since 2001, it has included the Zhongshan Electronic Base of China for its reputation in the electronic acoustics industry.

Currently, the city is trying to re-organize its fragmented industrialization. Meanwhile, the light and labour-intensive industry characteristic of the local economy faces the problem of a shortage of land in Zhongshan.

Tourism, recreation and leisure
 Two natural hot spring resorts are located in Sanxiang Town, such as the national own firm Zhongshan Hot Springs Resort, which is ranked top 10 hot spring resorts in China because there is a rare hot spring reservoir in the Pearl River Delta.
The World Lamp King Museum, a lamp museum in the form of a giant lamp scheduled to open in 2015, will be a major tourist attraction.
 Former Residence of Sun Yat-sen Memorial Museum: The former residence of Sun Zhongshan is at the center of the Memorial Museum, located in the village of Cuiheng.
 Xiaolan: Many houses in the town of Xiaolan have garden pavilions dedicated to the cultivation of chrysanthemums. Roofs and balconies, streets and lanes feature countless varieties of chrysanthemum plantings.
Zhongshan is home to a number of forest parks which are designed to protect the natural features of the land and offer visitors a chance to get closer to nature. Zhongshan Tianxin Forest Park was opened in 2015 as part of the city's "green lung" initiative.

Education

Colleges and universities

 Guangdong Pharmaceutical University (Zhongshan Campus)
 University of Electronic Science and Technology
 Guangdong Polytechnic Institute (Zhongshan Campus)
 Zhongshan Polytechnic
 Zhongshan Torch Polytechnic

High schools and institutions

 Zhongshan Overseas Chinese Middle School opened in 1954(Mr. Chen Maoyuan, a returned overseas Chinese, initiated the establishment of the school), is one of the first top-grade schools of Guangdong Province and the first national demonstrative ordinary high schools.
 Sun Yat-sen Memorial Secondary School was established in memory of Sun Yat-sen in 1934, and was built under the supervision of Soong Ching-ling, the widow of Sun Yat-sen.
 Zhongshan No. 1 Middle School opened in 1908.
 Guangdong Zhongshan Experimental Middle School
 Zhongshan Guishan Middle School
 Guangdong Bowen International School
 Sanxin Bilingual School
 China-Hong Kong English School

Notable people
 Sun Yat-sen, statesman and political philosopher, first leader of the Kuomintang; served as the provisional first president of the Republic of China 
 , professor, department of Chinese Literature and director of Hong Kong Historical and Cultural Research Center at Zhuhai College, (Jilin University); Honorary Fellow of the Royal Asiatic Society Hong Kong; museums consultant for the Hong Kong Leisure and Cultural Services Department
 Cheng Chung-tai , Hong Kong academic, social activist, and politician

Transportation

Public Buses 
Zhongshan Public Transport Group Co., Ltd. operates many bus routes throughout the city. Stop announcements are voiced in Mandarin and Cantonese on all buses. On BRT system buses, announcements are also voiced in English. By purchasing a Zhongshan Tong card from authorized retailers, riders can receive a discount of 50% on all bus rides. Elderly citizens are allowed to ride for free.

Ferry Transport 
Chu Kong Passenger Transport (CKS) connects Zhongshan with Hong Kong with multiple daily scheduled high-speed ferry services to both Hong Kong–Macau Ferry Terminal on Hong Kong Island and Hong Kong China Ferry Terminal in Kowloon. The trip by ferry takes about 1.5 hours.

Railway 
Guangzhou–Zhuhai Intercity Railway serves the city of Zhongshan with seven stations.

Metro 
The Zhongshan Metro system is currently under planning with 2 lines.

Aviation 

There is a bus service from Zhongshan to Shenzhen Bao'an International Airport in Shenzhen.

Additionally Zhongshan is served by Hong Kong International Airport; ticketed passengers can take ferries from the Zhongshan Ferry Terminal to the HKIA Skypier. There are also coach bus services connecting Zhongshan with HKIA.

Major projects 
 The Shenzhen-Zhongshan Bridge will connect Zhongshan with the city of Shenzhen on the Eastern side of the Pearl River Delta. It will consist of a series of bridges and tunnels, starting from Bao'an International Airport on the Shenzhen side. Construction of the proposed  eight-lane link started in 2017, with completion scheduled for 2024.

Twin towns – sister cities

Zhongshan has seven sister cities:

  Burnaby, British Columbia, Canada (2011)
  Puntarenas, Costa Rica
  Culiacán, Mexico
  Cairns, Australia
  Alameda County, California, United States
  Honolulu, Hawaii, United States (1997)
  Moriguchi, Osaka, Japan (1998)

References

External links

 Zhongshan government website 
 Zhongshan News website 
 Zhongshan News website (translated to English by Google)

 
Prefecture-level divisions of Guangdong
Pearl River Delta